William David Thomas (10 November 1886 – 8 October 1974) was an Australian rules footballer who played for the South Melbourne Football Club in the Victorian Football League (VFL) between 1906 and 1913 and then for the Richmond Football Club from 1914 to 1916 and again in 1919. His son Len Thomas was a premiership player for South Melbourne.

"Son", as he was nicknamed, was captain-coach of South Melbourne in 1910 and 1911 and was captain of Richmond for every game he played for them.

References

External links

Sydney Swans players
Sydney Swans Premiership players
Sydney Swans coaches
Richmond Football Club players
Australian rules footballers from Victoria (Australia)
1886 births
1974 deaths
One-time VFL/AFL Premiership players